Acontia luteola is a moth of the family Noctuidae first described by Max Saalmüller in 1891. It is known from Réunion and Madagascar.

References

luteola